Microdytes is a genus of beetles in the family Dytiscidae, containing the following species:

 Microdytes akitai Wewalka, 1997
 Microdytes balkei Wewalka, 1997
 Microdytes belli J.Balfour-Browne, 1946
 Microdytes bistroemi Wewalka, 1997
 Microdytes boukali Wewalka, 1997
 Microdytes championi J.Balfour-Browne, 1946
 Microdytes dimorphus Wewalka, 1997
 Microdytes elgae Hendrich, Balke & Wewalka, 1995
 Microdytes franzi Wewalka & Wang, 1998
 Microdytes gabrielae Wewalka, 1997
 Microdytes hainanensis Wewalka, 1997
 Microdytes hendrichi Wewalka, 1997
 Microdytes holzmannorum Wewalka & Wang, 1998
 Microdytes jaechi Wewalka, 1997
 Microdytes lotteae Wewalka, 1998
 Microdytes maculatus (Motschulsky, 1859)
 Microdytes mariannae Wewalka, 1997
 Microdytes mazzoldii Wewalka & Wang, 1998
 Microdytes menopausis Wewalka, 1997
 Microdytes nilssoni Wewalka, 1997
 Microdytes pasiricus (Csiki, 1938)
 Microdytes sabitae Vazirani, 1968
 Microdytes sarawakensis Wewalka, 1997
 Microdytes satoi Wewalka, 1997
 Microdytes schoedli Wewalka, 1997
 Microdytes schoenmanni Wewalka, 1997
 Microdytes schuhi Wewalka, 1997
 Microdytes schwendingeri Wewalka, 1997
 Microdytes shepardi Wewalka, 1997
 Microdytes shunichii Satô, 1995
 Microdytes sinensis Wewalka, 1997
 Microdytes tomokunii Satô, 1981
 Microdytes uenoi Satô, 1972
 Microdytes zetteli Wewalka, 1997

References

Dytiscidae